Sir Francis Sykes, 1st Baronet (1732–1804) was an English country landowner and politician who sat in the House of Commons between 1771 and 1804.  He was sometime Governor of Cossimbazar in India, being styled an English nabob by his peers.

Career
Sykes was born in Thornhill in the West Riding of Yorkshire in 1732.

Having joined the British East India Company, Sykes amassed a fortune in Bengal at the court of the Nawab. He became the Governor of Cossimbazar. During his time in India, he became good friends with both Warren Hastings and Lord Clive.

On his return to England, Sykes purchased Ackworth Park in Yorkshire and Basildon Park in Berkshire. He was for many years the Member of Parliament for Shaftesbury, and then for Wallingford. He acquired a baronetcy in 1781. Sir Francis lived in Basildon, although he died in 1804, before his house there was completed. His son, Francis William Sykes (1767–1804) also served as the Member of Parliament for Wallingford.

Memorial
Both Sir Francis and his son are commemorated in an unusual memorial at St Bartholomew's Church, Lower Basildon, which reuses a 14th-century chest tomb in the chancel wall. It was sculpted by John Flaxman.

References

1732 births
1804 deaths
Baronets in the Baronetage of Great Britain
Members of the Parliament of Great Britain for English constituencies
People from Dewsbury
People from Thornhill, West Yorkshire
People from Basildon, Berkshire
British East India Company people
English landowners
British MPs 1768–1774
British MPs 1774–1780
British MPs 1780–1784
British MPs 1784–1790
British MPs 1790–1796
British MPs 1796–1800
Members of the Parliament of the United Kingdom for English constituencies
UK MPs 1801–1802
UK MPs 1802–1806